Burton Lee French (August 1, 1875 – September 12, 1954) was a congressman from Idaho. French served as a Republican in the House from 1903 to 1909, 1911 to 1915 and 1917 to 1933. With a combined 26 years in office, he remains the longest-serving U.S. House member in Idaho history.

Early years
Burton Lee French was born in Delphi, Indiana, to Mina Philippena French (née Fisher) and Charles Albert French. The fourth of nine children, he moved with his parents in 1880 to Kearney, Nebraska, and to Princeton, Idaho via San Francisco two years later. A year later they moved to Palouse, Washington, and French attended public schools and graduated in 1891. French entered the University of Idaho at Moscow in 1893, but interrupted his studies to teach school in Kendrick and Juliaetta, Idaho. He finished his degree in 1901 and then was a fellow at the University of Chicago 1901–1903 in political science and studied law. He was admitted to the bar and commenced practice back in Idaho at Moscow. French was a member of the state legislature from 1898–1902, first elected while an undergraduate student. While in the legislature, he met his wife, Winfred E. Hartley. She was a Boise schoolteacher from Nebraska and they were married in 1904. They had a daughter that died as an infant in 1908.

Congress
French was first elected to Congress in 1902 at age 27 and won his last election in 1930. He was originally elected as the sole at-large member from Idaho, representing the entire state. Idaho gained a second seat for the 1912 election and both seats were at-large through the 1916 election.  Beginning with the 1918 election, French represented the state's First Congressional District, with the term commencing in March 1919.

Election results

Source:^ Incumbent when he won seat with new designation in 1912 and 1918.

Death
French died in Ohio in 1954 after a year's battle with leukemia. He had been a professor at Miami University in Oxford, Ohio, from 1935 to 1947, when he retired. His wife had died of an extended illness twenty years earlier in 1934 in Moscow and both are buried at Moscow Cemetery east of the city, with their infant daughter (1908).

References

External links

University of Idaho Library – Burton Lee French (1875-1954) papers, 1890-1954
Political Graveyard – Burton L. French

American Presbyterians
1875 births
1954 deaths
People from Moscow, Idaho
People from Delphi, Indiana
Republican Party members of the United States House of Representatives from Idaho
People from Palouse, Washington